Alice Priscilla Lyle Oswald (née Keen; born 31 August 1966) is a British poet from Reading, Berkshire. Her work won the T. S. Eliot Prize in 2002 and the Griffin Poetry Prize in 2017. In September 2017, she was named as BBC Radio 4's second Poet-in-Residence, succeeding Daljit Nagra. On 1 October 2019, she took up the post of Oxford Professor of Poetry.

Biography
Oswald is the daughter of Charles William Lyle Keen and Lady Priscilla Mary Rose Curzon, daughter of Edward Curzon, 6th Earl Howe. Oswald read Classics at New College, Oxford. She then trained as a gardener and worked at such sites as Chelsea Physic Garden, Wisley and Clovelly Court Gardens. She currently lives on the Dartington Estate in Devon with her husband, the playwright Peter Oswald (also a trained classicist), and her three children. Alice Oswald is the sister of actor Will Keen and writer Laura Beatty and the aunt of Keen's daughter Dafne.

Works
In 1994, she was the recipient of an Eric Gregory Award. Her first collection of poetry, The Thing in the Gap-Stone Stile (1996), was shortlisted for a Forward Poetry Prize (Best First Collection) in 1996, as well as the T. S. Eliot Prize in 1997.

Her second collection, Dart (2002), combined verse and prose, and tells the story of the River Dart in Devon from a variety of perspectives. Jeanette Winterson called it a " … moving, changing poem, as fast-flowing as the river and as deep … a celebration of difference … ". Dart won the T. S. Eliot Prize in 2002.

In 2004, Oswald was named as one of the Poetry Book Society's Next Generation poets. Her collection Woods etc., published in 2005, was shortlisted for the Forward Poetry Prize (Best Collection).

In 2009 she published both A sleepwalk on the Severn and Weeds and Wildflowers, which won the inaugural Ted Hughes Award for New Work in Poetry, and was shortlisted for the T. S. Eliot Prize.

In October 2011, Oswald published her 6th collection, Memorial. Subtitled "An Excavation of the Iliad", Memorial is based on the Iliad attributed to Homer, but departs from the narrative form of the Iliad to focus on, and so commemorate, the individual named characters whose deaths are mentioned in that poem. Later in October 2011, Memorial was shortlisted for the T. S. Eliot Prize, but in December 2011, Oswald withdrew the book from the shortlist, citing concerns about the ethics of the prize's sponsors. In 2013, Memorial won the Poetry Society’s Corneliu M. Popescu Prize for poetry in translation.

Oswald was a judge for the Griffin Poetry Prize in 2016. In 2017, she won the Griffin Poetry Prize for her seventh collection of poems, Falling Awake.

Bibliography
 1996: The Thing in the Gap-Stone Stile, Oxford University Press, 
 2002: Dart, Faber and Faber, 
 2002: Earth Has Not Any Thing to Shew More Fair: A Bicentennial Celebration of Wordsworth's Sonnet Composed upon Westminster Bridge (co-edited with Peter Oswald and Robert Woof), Shakespeare's Globe & The Wordsworth Trust, 
 2005: The Thunder Mutters: 101 Poems for the Planet (editor), Faber and Faber, 
 2005: Woods etc. Faber and Faber, 
 2009: Weeds and Wild Flowers, Faber and Faber, 
 2009: A sleepwalk on the Severn, Faber and Faber, 
 2011: Memorial, Faber and Faber, 
 2016: Falling Awake, Jonathan Cape
 2019: Nobody, Jonathan Cape
 2020: A Short Story of Falling - Metal Engravings by Maribel Mas. Published by Andrew J Moorhouse, Fine Press Poetry

Awards and recognition
 1994: Eric Gregory Award
 1996: Arts Foundation Award for Poetry
 1996: shortlisted for Forward Poetry Prize (Best First Collection), The Thing in the Gap-Stone Stile
 1997: shortlisted for T. S. Eliot Prize, for The Thing in the Gap-Stone Stile
 2002: T. S. Eliot Prize for Dart
 2005: shortlisted for Forward Poetry Prize (Best Poetry Collection of the Year), for Woods etc.
 2005: shortlisted for T. S. Eliot Prize for Woods etc.
 2007: Forward Poetry Prize (Best Single Poem) for 'Dunt'
 2009: Ted Hughes Award for New Work in Poetry for Weeds and Wild Flowers
 2011: shortlisted for T. S. Eliot Prize, for Memorial, subsequently withdrawn due to Oswald's ethical concerns.
2013: Warwick Prize for Writing, winner for Memorial
2013: Corneliu M. Popescu Prize for European Poetry, winner for Memorial
2016: Costa Award for Poetry for Falling Awake
2017: Griffin Poetry Prize for Falling Awake

References

External links

Contemporarywriters.com Alice Oswald – Biography and Analysis of her Works
Poetry Archive profile with poems written and audio 
Interview with Oswald. Magama magazine, issue 51 2008. "Presiding Spirits". 
London Review of Books Review of Woods etc by Aingeal Clare.
Guardian article 30 March 2010: Alice Oswald wins inaugural Ted Hughes award. Accessed 2010-03-31
'Tithonus 46 minutes in the life of the dawn' 'Alice Oswald'

1966 births
Living people
English women poets
Alice
20th-century English poets
21st-century English poets
20th-century English women writers
21st-century English women writers
Oxford Professors of Poetry
T. S. Eliot Prize winners
Costa Book Award winners
The New Yorker people